Norrie McWhirter (born 4 September 1969, in Johnstone) is a Scottish former footballer, who played for St Mirren for the entirety of his career which began in 1985 and ended due to injury in 2000, following 301 appearances for the club.

McWhirter was inducted to the St Mirren Hall of Fame in 2009.

See also 

List of one-club men

External links 
 

1969 births
Living people
People from Johnstone
Association football central defenders
St Mirren F.C. players
Livingston F.C. non-playing staff
Scottish Football League players
Scottish footballers
Footballers from Renfrewshire
Scotland under-21 international footballers